Letomola contortus is a species of small air-breathing land snails, terrestrial pulmonate gastropod mollusks in the family Charopidae. This species is endemic to Australia.

References

Gastropods of Australia
Letomola
Gastropods described in 1924
Taxonomy articles created by Polbot
Taxobox binomials not recognized by IUCN